The Chichester Observer is a British weekly newspaper reporting on Chichester and the surrounding area.

The newspaper is a member of the Independent Press Standards Organisation.

History 
The Chichester Observer and West Sussex Recorder published its first issue on 15 June 1887.

The newspaper was renamed the Chichester Observer in 1936.

In November 2018 the assets of Johnston Press, the Observers then publisher, were acquired by JPI Media.

See also 

 JPIMedia
 Chichester, West Sussex

References

External links 

 
 Chichester Observer at the British Newspaper Archive

1887 establishments in England
Publications established in 1887
Newspapers published in Sussex
Chichester